Henry Westby Topping (26 October 1915 – July 2004) was an English footballer, who played at full back for various clubs in the 1930s and 1940s.

Football career
Topping was born in Prescot, Lancashire and started his football career at Rossendale United, before joining Stockport County in 1938. He remained with Stockport throughout World War II, including partnering his namesake Harry Topping in several wartime matches in 1941–42.

After the war he joined New Brighton, where he remained for two years making 67 Football League appearances. On his retirement from professional football, he joined Prescot Cables and was granted a benefit match in April 1951.

He also made several appearances for Manchester United during World War II. After his playing career with Stockport County, he went on to become player/manager.

References

1915 births
2004 deaths
Sportspeople from Prescot
English footballers
Rossendale United F.C. players
Stockport County F.C. players
New Brighton A.F.C. players
Prescot Cables F.C. players
English Football League players
Association football fullbacks